The Minotaur I, or just Minotaur is an American expendable launch system derived from the Minuteman II missile.  It is used to launch small satellites for the US Government, and is a member of the Minotaur family of rockets produced by Orbital Sciences Corporation (now Northrop Grumman).

Vehicle
The Minotaur I is the follow-on to the Orbital Sciences' Taurus (later re-named the "Minotaur-C") launch vehicle, combining the original Taurus's booster stage with a second stage from a Minuteman missile.

Minotaur I rockets consist of the M55A1 first stage and SR19 second stage of a decommissioned Minuteman missile. 
The Orion 50XL and Orion 38, from the Pegasus rocket, are used as third and fourth stages. A HAPS (Hydrazine Auxiliary Propulsion System) upper stage can also be flown if greater precision is needed, or the rocket needs to be able to manoeuvre to deploy multiple payloads.

The Minotaur I is 69 feet tall and 5 feet wide.

Initially Minotaur I launches are conducted from Space Launch Complex 8 at the Vandenberg Air Force Base. Starting with the launch of TacSat-2 in December 2006, launches have also been conducted from Pad 0B at the Mid-Atlantic Regional Spaceport on Wallops Island.

Launch history
There have been twelve launches of the Minotaur I, all successful.

See also
 Comparison of orbital launchers families
 Comparison of orbital launch systems

References

Minotaur (rocket family)